Rubens Charles Maciel (born December 24, 1979), aka "Cobrinha" and sometimes referred to as Rubens "Cobrinha" Charles, is a Brazilian Jiu Jitsu (BJJ) competitor.  He is considered the best featherweight in the decade  and to be among the best pound for pound jiu jitsu competitors in the world.  Cobrinha is a black belt in Brazilian jiu-jitsu under Fernando "Terere" Augusto and a member of Alliance Jiu Jitsu. Cobrinha has won a total of six world championship titles in Brazilian jiu-jitsu as a black belt in the featherweight (or lightweight) category. He started training BJJ in 2000, received his black belt in 2005, and has since medaled in every World Jiu-Jitsu Championship in which he has competed - a total of ten.  He is known for his attacking style of jiu jitsu and, in particular, for his guard.  His guard was voted the best Guard of the Decade by fellow World Champions.

Before opening his own school Cobrinha BJJ in Los Angeles, California, in 2011, he was an instructor at the Alliance Jiu Jitsu headquarters in Atlanta, Georgia. One of his notable students is Fabricio Werdum. On January 24, 2022, Cobrinha was announced as the tenth member of the inaugural class of the ADCC Hall of Fame.

Championship record

IBJJF World Championships
 2017 - Black Belt -70kg: 1st Place
 2016 - Black Belt -70kg: 3rd Place
 2015 - Black Belt -70kg: 2nd Place
 2014 - Black Belt -70kg: 2nd Place
 2013 - Black Belt -70kg: 3rd Place
 2012 - Black Belt -70kg: 2nd Place
 2011 - Black Belt -70kg: 3rd Place
 2010 - Black Belt -70kg: 2nd Place
 2009 - Black Belt -70kg: 1st Place
 2008 - Black Belt -70kg: 1st Place
 2007 - Black Belt -70kg: 1st Place
 2006 - Black Belt -70kg: 1st Place

IBJJF World No-Gi Championships
 2012 - Black Belt -76kg: 1st Place
 2011 - Black Belt -76kg: 1st Place
 2008 - Black Belt -76kg: 1st Place
 2007 - Black Belt -70kg: 1st Place

IBJJF Pan American Championships
 2017 - Black Belt -70kg: 1st Place
 [http://static.ibjjfdb.com/Campeonat
o/000162/pt-BR/Resultados.pdf 2013 - Black Belt -70kg: 2nd Place]
 2012 - Black Belt -70kg: 2nd Place
 2010 - Black Belt -70kg: 1st Place
 2009 - Black Belt -70kg: 1st Place
 2009 - Black Belt -Open Weight: 3rd Place
 2008 - Black Belt -70kg: 1st Place
 2007 - Black Belt -70kg: 1st Place

IBJJF Pan American No-Gi Championships
 2008 - Black Belt -76kg: 1st Place

IBJJF European Championships
 2017 - Black Belt -70kg: 1st Place
 2013 - Black Belt -70kg: 1st Place

IBJJF Brazilian National Championships
 2017 - Black Belt -70kg: 1st Place

ADCC 2017 Abu Dhabi Combat Club : Finland
 -66 kg: 1st place

ADCC 2015 Abu Dhabi Combat Club : Sao Paulo
 -66 kg: 1st place

ADCC 2013 Abu Dhabi Combat Club : Beijing
 -66 kg: 1st place

ADCC 2011 Abu Dhabi Combat Club : Nottingham
 -66 kg: 2nd place

ADCC 2009 Abu Dhabi Combat Club : Barcelona
 -66 kg: 2nd place

World Professional Jiu-Jitsu Cup
 2011 - Black Belt -Absolute: 2nd Place
 2011 - Black Belt -74kg: 3rd Place
 2009 - Black Belt -65kg: 2nd Place

References

Tournament Results - Official Homepage
 CBJJ/IBJJF Tournament Results
 CBJJO Tournament Results
 Rubens Charles Maciel BJJ (GI) career on MARanking | Martial Arts Ranking

Recognition
Gracie Magazine votes Cobrinha as the most consistent fighter of 2008
Gracie Magazine names Cobrinha competitor of the year - 2008
World Champions from last 10 yrs vote Cobrinha as having the best guard of the decade
OnTheMat.com selects Cobrinha as the 2008 BJJ Fighter of Year
2008 World Championship trailer featuring Cobrinha

External links
Official School Website
Official Web Site
Alliance Martial Arts Web Site
Rubens Charles Cobrinha on *BJJ Heroes

Brazilian practitioners of Brazilian jiu-jitsu
1979 births
Living people
People awarded a black belt in Brazilian jiu-jitsu
World Brazilian Jiu-Jitsu Championship medalists
World No-Gi Brazilian Jiu-Jitsu Championship medalists
IBJJF Hall of Fame inductees
Sportspeople from Londrina
ADCC Hall of Fame inductees